La Nueva España is a daily newspaper in Spain.  Published in Oviedo, it serves Asturias. The publisher of the paper is Editoral Prensa Asturiana. It is published in tabloid format. The paper has an independent political stance.

Letizia Ortiz Rocasolano, Queen of Spain, worked for La Nueva España when she was a university student.

La Nueva España publishes a list of the Asturian of the Month. The paper had nearly a circulation of 100,000 copies on weekends in 1998.

See also
 List of newspapers in Spain

References

External links
  La Nueva España official website

1936 establishments in Spain
Mass media in Oviedo
Daily newspapers published in Spain
Publications established in 1936
Spanish-language newspapers